Forum Iulii, Latin meaning 'marketplace of Julius', or Forum Julii in modernized spelling, can refer in Latin to the following cities: 
Fréjus in France
Cividale del Friuli in Italy
Voghera in Italy

See also
 Battle of Forum Julii, 69 AD
 Forum Julium (disambiguation)